Stafford Municipal School District (SMSD) is a school district based in Stafford, Texas, United States in Greater Houston. The district covers all of the city of Stafford and is controlled by the city, making it the only school district in Texas that is not an independent school district operated by an independent school board.

The Primary/Elementary School building houses grades Pre-K through 5, the Middle School building houses grades 6 through 8, the High School building houses grades 9 through 12. The administration building and athletic facilities are on the same campus as the school buildings.

The Stafford MSD area is served by the Houston Community College System

In 2018, the school district was rated an overall B by the Texas Education Agency.

History
In 1977, Stafford schools broke away from the Fort Bend Independent School District, which caused several rounds of federal litigation and by 1981 it was finally declared that the Stafford Municipal School District was constitutional. Almost all of Stafford was in the Fort Bend District, with a minuscule portion in the Houston Independent School District. All of Stafford is now zoned to the Stafford Municipal School District, which is the only school district in all of Texas that is controlled by a city.

Politics and geography
While Stafford MSD is a part of the City of Stafford and took all of the land in the city in 1977 when it was created, Stafford MSD cannot annex any territory without the consent of the other school districts which own that territory. Because of this, the City of Stafford, for a period of over 20 years ending in 2006, did not annex any territory in its extraterritorial jurisdiction as that would mean portions of its territory would fall within these independent school districts: Alief, Ft. Bend, and Houston. The city government of Stafford wants its school district's territory to be the same as its city limits.

Administration

Superintendent 
The current superintendent of the Stafford Municipal School District is Robert Bostic. Before being appointed superintendent, Bostic was the Assistant Superintendent for Academic Programs for Denton Independent School District.

Schools

 Stafford High School 
 Stafford Middle School 
 Stafford Elementary School
 Stafford Early Childhood Center (SECC) (infants-Kindergarten)
 Stafford MSD STEM Magnet School (SSMA)

The school board approved a stricter dress code for the high school in 2005.

 Former divisions
 Previously schools were divided as such: Stafford Primary School (Early education to grade 1), Stafford Elementary School (2-4), Stafford Intermediate School (5-6), and Stafford Middle School (7-8), and then the high school.

Athletics
In 2014 the district was considering whether it should install artificial turf in its sports fields. At the time it had residual funds from a $49.9 million bond passed in 2011. As of 2016 the school district has had artificial turf inside its stadium.

Notable alumni
Craig Robertson, football player
Adrian Awasom, football player
Boris Anyama, football player
Jalen Pitre, football player

See also

List of school districts in Texas

References

External links

 
 Stafford MSD complex map
 
 Founding of Stafford Municipal School District

School districts in Fort Bend County, Texas
School districts in Harris County, Texas